King George was launched on the Thames in 1781. She spent about three-quarters of her career sailing for the Hudson's Bay Company (HBC), and was the third vessel by her name to sail for the HBC. She then spent the last quarter of her career as a whaler in the British northern whale fishery. She foundered there without a trace in 1822.

Career
King George first appeared in Lloyd's Register (LR) in 1781 with J[oseph] Richards, master, the Hudson's Bay Company, owners, and trade London–Hudson's Bay. From then through 1811 she sailed for the Hudson's Bay Company (HBC) under a variety of masters.

On 8 April 1793, shortly after the outbreak of war with France Captain John Richards acquired a letter of marque.  Captain Richards was dismissed the company's service on 18 February 1801, after he admitted to having smuggled furs, "contrary to the Duty" he owed the HBC.

His replacement was Captain John Turner, who had spent a decade as the captain of the HBC's .

On 2 May 1808 Captain John Tinner (or Turner), acquired a letter of marque. Also in 1808, the ice was the heaviest and closest it had been in 41 years.

The HBC sold King George in May 1811 to Daniel and Samuel Brent & Sons. The Brents chartered her back to the HBC for a period and later offered to sell her back to the company for £5,400, an offer the HBC declined.

On 18 August 1813 King George and  arrived at Hudson Bay.

She then became a Northern Fisheries whaler, possibly after the Brents sold her to Elvgin & Co.

On 19 April 1814 Lloyd's List reported that King George, Gordon, master, had had to put into Aberdeen leaky while sailing to the whaling grounds at Davis Strait. Two American privateers, one of them , had chased her in.

The following data is from Coltish:

Fate
King George, Proven, master, sailed from Gravesend on 4 April 1822 for Greenland. She was reported to have been there on 5 July with three fish.

King George was then presumed to have been lost with all hands in the Davis Strait.

Notes

Citations

References
 
 
 

1781 ships
Age of Sail merchant ships of England
Hudson's Bay Company ships
Whaling ships
Maritime incidents in 1822
Missing ships
Ships lost with all hands